Antiguraleus morgana is a species of sea snail, a marine gastropod mollusk in the family Mangeliidae.

Description
The length of the shell attains 9.1 mm, its diameter 3.3 mm.

Distribution
This marine species occurs off East Cape Province to Transkei, South Africa

References

External links
 Barnard, K. H. 1958. Contributions to the knowledge of South African marine Mollusca. Part I. Gastropoda: Prosobranchiata: Toxoglossa. Annals of the South African Museum 44 (4): 73-163, figs. 1-30, pI. 1.
  Kilburn, R. N. "Turridae (Mollusca: Gastropoda) of southern Africa and Mozambique. Part 7. Subfamily Crassispirinae, section 2." Annals of the Natal Museum 35.1 (1994): 177-228.
  Tucker, J.K. 2004 Catalog of recent and fossil turrids (Mollusca: Gastropoda). Zootaxa 682:1-1295.

Endemic fauna of South Africa
morgana
Gastropods described in 1958